Marisol Urrea Camarena (born 28 April 1978) is a Mexican politician affiliated with the National Action Party. As of 2014 she served as Deputy of the LIX Legislature of the Mexican Congress representing Jalisco.

References

1978 births
Living people
Politicians from Jalisco
Women members of the Chamber of Deputies (Mexico)
National Action Party (Mexico) politicians
21st-century Mexican politicians
21st-century Mexican women politicians
Deputies of the LIX Legislature of Mexico
Members of the Chamber of Deputies (Mexico) for Jalisco